Stepan Vasylovych Protsiuk (born 13 August 1964 in Kuty, Lviv Oblast) is a contemporary Ukrainian novelist, essayist and poet.

Biography 
Stepan Protsiuk was born on 13 August 1964 in small village Kuty in Lviv Oblast of Ukrainian SSR. His parents were school teachers, and his father was a political prisoner who was sentenced for anti-Soviet propaganda before Stepan's birth. Shortly after his birth, Protsiuk's parents moved to Ivano-Frankivsk Oblast.

Stepan Protsiuk studied in Vasyl Stefanyk Precarpathian National University and obtained a PhD (Candidate of Sciences) degree in philology in the Institute of Literature of National Academy of Sciences of Ukraine. Since the early 1990s, he has been living in Ivano-Frankivsk and teaching Ukrainian literature at the Precarpathian National University alongside his writing career.

Stepan Protsiuk is a member the Ukrainian center of PEN International. Protsiuk was a member of National Writers' Union of Ukraine since 1995 until he quit the organization in 2017, claiming that he had "different views on the development of the Ukrainian literature".

Protsiuk is married, he is a father to two sons. He currently lives in Ivano-Frankivsk.

Literary works 
Stepan Protsiuk started his literary career as a poet in the early 1990s. Along with Ivan Tsyperdiuk and Ivan Andrusiak, he founded poetic group New Degeneration, which was among the most famous Ukrainian poetic groups in the early 1990s. New Degeneration created a controversy among prominent Ukrainian writers and literary critics as, for example, Oles Honchar criticized the group's approach to literature, while Lina Kostenko praised it. In 1992, the group published their first book New Degeneration (foreword by Yurii Andrukhovych), which included Protsiuk's collection of poems titled At the Edge of Two Truths. New Degeneration was active until the mid-1990s.

In the late 1990s, Stepan Protsiuk stopped writing poetry and gradually switched to prose works. His first novel Infection, which is one of his most famous works, was published in 2002 and devoted to social and psychological issues, being set in 20th-century Ukraine. Protsiuk received both praise and criticism for his depiction of national and mental problems of Ukrainians.

In his works, Protsiuk explores various social problems facing Ukraine today (Infection) or in the past (Tenth Line, The Grass Cannot Die), as well as existential problems, such as individual and collective being (Destruction of a Doll) or relationship between parents and children (Hit Your Head against the Wall). His literary style has been described as a mix of postmodernism and neo avant-garde.

In the late 2000s, Protsiuk debuted with his novels for children. First novel, Mariyka and Kostyk, was followed by two sequels, In Love with the Sun and Argonauts. All of them were published in Kyiv-based publishing house Grani-T. Protsiuk also authored three books for children published in Vinnytsia-based publishing house Teza.

Protsiuk is also known for his fiction novels devoted to prominent Ukrainian writers – Vasyl Stefanyk (The Rose of Ritual Pain), Volodymyr Vynnychenko (Masks Fall off Slowly), Arhip Teslenko (Black Apple).

Protsiuk's major books include:
 At the Edge of Two Truths (1992; part of book New Degeneration, foreword by Yurii Andrukhovych), a book of poems.
 Always and Never (1999), a book of poems.
 Infection (2002), a novel.
 Totem (2005), a novel.
 Sacrifice (2007), a novel.
 Tightrope Walkers (2007), a book of essays.
 Destruction of a Doll (2010), a novel.
 Blood Test (2010), a book of essays.
 The Rose of Ritual Pain (2010), a novel.
 Masks Fall off Slowly (2011), a novel.
 Black Apple (2011), a novel.
 Hit Your Head against the Wall (2011), a novel.
 Tenth Line (2014), a novel.
 Under the Wings of the Great Mother (2015), a novel.
 The Grass Cannot Die (2017), a novel.
 Fingers in the sand (2017), a novel.
 Rejected and Risen: Essays on Writers and Society (2020), a book of essays.

Awards and recognition 
Stepan Protsiuk is widely considered to be among the most controversial Ukrainian intellectual writers.

He is the 2015 winner of the "Golden Ukrainian Writers" award for the largest circulation of books in Ukraine. Protsiuk's novels Infection and Tenth line were nominated for Shevchenko National Prize in 2003 and 2016, respectively. Apart from nationwide awards, Protsiuk received various local awards in Ivano-Frankivsk Oblast, such as Ivan Franko Literary Award (2002) and Vasyl Stefanyk Literary Award (2003).

Protsiuk's works have been translated into several languages. In late 2008, Protsiuk's novel Totem was published in the Azerbaijani language in publishing house Vektor in Baku. His short stories and poems have been translated into the German, Russian, Slovak, Polish, Czech, and French languages. Protsiuk's presentation were held in dozens of Ukrainian cities, as well as in Chicago (in Ukrainian Institute of Modern Art), New York, Rome (in the Embassy of Ukraine), Paris, Berlin, Helsinki, Kraków and other cities.

Several works by Stepan Protsiuk are included in the list of literature recommended for reading in middle and high school in Ukraine. Along with several other poetic groups created in the late 1980s and early 1990s, group New Degeneration co-founded by Protsiuk is included in the program of External independent evaluation, the statewide test used for admission to universities. Protsiuk's books for teenagers are recommended for reading in 7th grade, while his novel Infection is recommended for students of 11th grade.

Protsiuk's literary legacy is the subject of two scholarly books (by Bohdan Pastuh and Oleh Solovey), one play based on Protsiuk's novel Infection (Tetiana Kinzerska), and numerous scientific and journalist articles.

References

Bibliography 
Books about Stepan Protsiuk:
  (Eternal Discrepancies of the Heart: Stepan Protsiuk's Prose)
  (Orgasm and Despair (The Case of Stepan Protsiuk))
Fiction books based on Protsiuk's works:
  (Crossroad (Adaptation of S. Protsiuk's Novel Infection))

External links 
 Stepan Protsiuk, “A true love to a writer’s books is a kind of faith”, Opinion, 2019
 Interview with Stepan Protsiuk, Ukrayina Moloda, 2007.
 Interview with Stepan Protsiuk, The Day, 2010.
 Interview with Stepan Protsiuk, Obozrevatel, 2014.
 Excerpt from Protsiuk's book Hit Your Head against the Wall, Ukrayinska Pravda, 2018.
 Stepan Protsiuk's essays: “Idolatry”, “Eternal love”.

Ukrainian poets
Writers from Ivano-Frankivsk
1964 births
Living people
Ukrainian male writers